If the Wind Frightens You is a 1960 Belgian drama film directed by Emile Degelin. It was entered into the 1960 Cannes Film Festival.

Cast
 Elisabeth Dulac as Claude
 Guy Lesire as Pierre
 Henri Billen as Playboy
 Antinea
 André Dandois
 Gaston Desmedt
 Jacqueline Harpan
 Jacqueline Harpman
 Bobette Jouret as Elizabeth
 Anne-Marie La Fère as Bernadette
 Paul Roland as Nozem

References

External links

1960 films
1960s French-language films
1960 drama films
Belgian black-and-white films
Films directed by Emile Degelin
French-language Belgian films